Francis Abigail (16 January 184023 July 1921) was politician and manufacturer from New South Wales, Australia.

Early life 
Francis Abigail was the son of Hannah  Coney and William Abigail. In 1860, he immigrated to Sydney and was married the following year.

Politics and public service
He served as a Member of the New South Wales Legislative Assembly for West Sydney from 1880 to June 1891. He served as Secretary for Mines in the fourth ministry of  Sir Henry Parkes from 20 January 1887 to 10 January 1889.

He was a Justice of the Peace for the colonies of New South Wales and Victoria.

Abigail was a member of the New South Wales Commission for the Melbourne Centennial Exhibition of 1888. In 1890, he was a member of the Exhibition of Mining and Metallurgy, held at the Crystal Palace. That same year, he visited England and the various Orange bodies in England and the north of Ireland. While in London, he gave evidence before the Royal Commission on Mines.

Criminal conviction
In July 1887 he was elected to the board of the Australian Banking Co, subsequently becoming chairman of directors and the company was placed in liquidation on 10 November 1891. In October 1892 he was charged, along with 6 others, with falsely representing the affairs of the bank, and was found not guilty. He was then charged with conspiring with the manager, Roderick McNamara, to issue a false balance sheet, with fraudulent intent. They were convicted and Abigail was sentenced to imprisonment for 5 years while McNamara was sentenced to 7 years. He was released from prison in June 1895 after serving 2 years 6 months and 29 days.

Later life
He attempted to return to politics, standing as an independent  candidate at the 1901 NSW Senate election, but polled 7,164 votes. well short of the 70,000 needed for election.

References 

 

1840 births
1921 deaths
Members of the New South Wales Legislative Assembly
Politicians from London
Australian justices of the peace
English emigrants to colonial Australia
Australian politicians convicted of crimes